Faithia Williams (born 5 February 1971) is a Nigerian actress, filmmaker, producer and director.

Early life
Faithia who is of Delta state descent, was born in Ikeja in February 1971. She was born into a polygamous family of nine. Faithia attended Maryland Primary School and Maryland Comprehensive Secondary School in Lagos state. She obtained her West African School Certificate in Maryland Comprehensive Secondary School. After that, she studied in the Kwara State Polytechnic for a diploma certificate. In 2016, Faithia got admission into Olabisi Onabanjo University to study Filming.

Career
Faithia became an actress by chance. Faithia's uncle, Alhaji Fatai Teniola, asked her to stand in for an actress that failed to show up in one of the productions of their movie. Williams played her first role in the film title "Ta lo pa chief". She has starred, produced, and directed several Nigerian films over the years. In 2008, she won the Africa Movie Academy Award for the Most Outstanding Actress Indigenous and her movie Iranse Aje won the best indigenous film of the year. In April 2014, she won the Africa Movie Academy Award, having emerged as best actress of the year along with Odunlade Adekola who emerged as best actor of the year. She also won the Best Indigenous Language award for the work done in the film "Iya Alalake" at the 2015 Africa Magic Viewers’ Choice Awards.

Personal life
Williams was formerly married to veteran Nollywood actor, Saheed Balogun, with whom she has two children, a son and a daughter. Fathia also has a son from an earlier relationship.

Awards
 Most Outstanding Indigenous Actress (2008)
 AMVCA Best Local Language Yoruba (2015)

Filmography
Farayola (2009)
Aje meta (2008)
Aje metta 2 (2008)
Awawu (2015)
Teni Teka (2015)
Omo Ale (2015)
Agbelebu Mi (2016)
Basira Badia (2016)
Adakeja (2016)
Eku Eda (2006)
MY WOMAN (2018)
Shola Arikusa (film))
President Kuti 
10 Days In Sun City (2017)
Victims (2017)
Ehi's Bitters (2018)
Seven and a Half Dates (2018)
Merry Men: The Real Yoruba Demons (2018)
To Love Again (2018)
Mokalik ( Mechanic) 2019 
Dear Affy (2020)
Oba Bi Olorun (2021)
Esin (2021)
Osun, the Goddess(2021)
President Kuti (2021)
Hatred(2021)
Alagogo Ide (2021)
Tree (2022)
Ojukoro (2022)
Aníkúlápó (2022)

See also
List of Yoruba people

References

Living people
1969 births
Nigerian film actresses
Actresses in Yoruba cinema
Actresses from Delta State
20th-century Nigerian actresses
21st-century Nigerian actresses
Nigerian film directors
Olabisi Onabanjo University alumni
Africa Magic Viewers' Choice Awards winners
Nigerian women film directors
Nigerian women film producers